is a Japanese animator and character designer.

Career
Initially, he joined eroge game company Studio Lux as an illustrator around 2002 and used the name , a play on the Hiragana spelling of his name , but left the company in August 2003. After leaving Studio Lux, Yamamura joined newly founded animation production company Studio Pastoral, where he initially did in-between animation and was quickly promoted to key animator in less than a year, and again to animation director by 2005.

While Studio Pastoral itself was a sub-contracting animation firm not producing its own titles, from the very beginning of the studio's history it developed a close relationship to studio Shaft. Yamamura worked on a number of different titles from a number of different studios that were outsourcing work to Studio Pastoral, but he gained prominence within Shaft's works and mainly took on jobs for the studio. In 2007, he was given his first job as a chief animation director on Shaft's adaptation of Sayonara, Zetsubou-Sensei, with characters designed by Hideyuki Morioka whom Yamamura had worked with on REC (2006) and liked the designs of. Although from different studiosMorioka an employee of Studio Silverand doing work for a studio neither belonged to (at the time), Morioka and Yamamura have worked together on numerous occasions since Sayonara, Zetsubou Sensei including all of the series' sequels, and the first season of Maria Holic (2009), which Morioka also designed the characters for, and Studio Pastoral assisted in the production of. As previously mentioned, Yamamura worked on Shaft's gross outsources to Studio Pastoral previously, and had met director Akiyuki Shinbo during the latter-half of the production to Negima!? around 2006. Their first meeting occurred when Yamamura was in the Shaft production studio and he was watching Sasuga no Sarutobi (1982) on DVD, and Shinbo had come up to him to ask if he was watching Sasuga no Sarutobi. Sayonara, Zetsubou-Sensei was Yamamura's first time working directly with Shinbo, however; and as a fan of Shinbo's work, having watched his series for a "long time", Yamamura was initially nervous. In 2010, Yamamura started doing character design work, with his first job as such being Shaft's And Yet the Town Moves; and a year later, he also designed the characters for the Katteni Kaizō OVA, an adaptation of another manga from the author of Sayonara, Zetsubou-Sensei.

Since 2009, Shaft had started adapting Nisio Isin's Monogatari series of light novels; and when Bakemonogatari, the first seasondirected by Shinbo and Tatsuya Oishi, and with character designs by Akio Watanabeended, a new adaptation titled Kizumonogatari was announced. However, for several years, Oishi worked on the project and Shinbo invested in Tomoyuki Itamura to continue with other parts of the series, which Yamamura occasionally participated in alongside other series. Eventually, however, as Oishi completed the storyboards to the project, staff were invited to join it, which included Morioka as chief animation director (and character designer, co-credited with Watanabe); and around the spring of 2014, Yamamura was also invited to join as chief animation director. Eventually, the project was announced to be a film trilogy that premiered in 2016 and 2017. For the first film, Morioka and Yamamura split their duties as animation directors somewhat evenly, with Morioka working on the first half of the film and Yamamura on the second half, or split scene-by-scene. For the second and third films, however, they divvyed up the work based on the characters: Morioka supervised the drawings for the female characters, and Yamamura was in charge of the male characters; and for any particularly important scenes, Oishi assigned them to Yamamura or Morioka. Oishi was adamant about the female characters being "cute" and the male characters being "hot" to appeal to the fans, which coincides with Yamamura's drawing style according to Shinbo's comment that his drawings appeal to women.

In 2018, Yamamura collaborated with Masaaki Takiyama to draw the character designs and supervise the animation to Fate/Extra: Last Encore. In 2021, he designed the characters for an adaptation of a different Nisio Isin title, Pretty Boy Detective Club.

Yamamura's employment history during the 2010s is ambiguous. He still belonged to Studio Pastoral as of the 2000s, but Pastoral's relationship with Shaft ended around 2011 or 2012. Whether Yamamura stayed with Pastoral and did work for Shaft, left Pastoral and went freelance (working exclusively with Shaft), or left Pastoral and joined Shaft is not known. However, both he and Shaft veteran animator Genichirou Abe participated on Onimai: I'm Now Your Sister! (2023) with  listed parenthetically next to their names in the credits. Since early 2023, Yamamura's Twitter account also mentions him as a part of Shaft.

Works
This is an incomplete list.

Teleivison series
 Highlights character design and chief animation direction roles.

OVAs/ONAs

Films

Notes

Works cited

References

External links

Japanese animators
Living people
1981 births
People from Aichi Prefecture